Warner Cheuk Wing-hing (born March 24, 1959) is a Hong Kong administrative officer, former police officer, currently Deputy Chief Secretary for Administration, and former Permanent Secretary of the Innovation and Technology Bureau. After his civil service career, he briefly served as Director of the Dialogue Office of the Policy Innovation and Coordination Office. Served as a consultant to the Financial Secretary's Private Office. In July 2022, he was appointed as the Deputy Secretary for Administration of the Hong Kong Government.

Career 
Cheuk graduated from the University of Hong Kong in 1981 with a Bachelor of Arts degree, and joined the Police Force as a Police Inspector in June of the same year. In August 1984, he was transferred to the administrative grade, and in April 2007, he was promoted to the Directorate Class B Administrative Officer (D4), and in April 2017, he was promoted to the Director Class A First Class Administrative Officer (D8). He has served in various bureaux and departments, including the former two bureaux and Administration Branch, the former Administration and Information Branch, the former City and New Territories Administration, the Post Office, the former Finance Branch, the former Financial Services Branch, the Department of Health, the former Civil Service Bureau, the former Industry Department, InvestHK, Food and Environmental Hygiene Department, General Grades Division, former Health, Welfare and Food Bureau and Labor Department.

Important positions held by Cheuk include:

 2001: Assistant Director of Food and Environmental Hygiene Department (Headquarters)
 June 2001 to December 2003: Deputy Director (Environmental Hygiene), Food and Environmental Hygiene Department
 December 2003 to June 2006: Director of General Grades, Civil Service Bureau
 August 2006 to December 2007: Deputy Secretary for Health, Welfare and Food Bureau (Food and Environmental Hygiene) (hereinafter referred to as Deputy Secretary for Food and Health (Food))
 December 2007 to November 2010: Director of Food and Environmental Hygiene Department
 November 2010 to February 18, 2014: Commissioner for Labor
 From February 19, 2014 to the end of March 2014: Chairman of Administrative Officer Recruitment Committee 2014
 May 2, 2014 to November 2015: Administrative Commissioner, Department of Justice
 November 20, 2015 to April 12, 2019: Permanent Secretary for Innovation and Technology Bureau
 September 16, 2019 to March 15, 2020: Director of Dialogue Office, Policy Innovation and Co-ordination Office
 From July 1, 2022: Deputy Chief Secretary for Administration. According to the nomination of John Lee, the sixth chief executive of the Hong Kong Special Administrative Region, on June 19, 2022, the State Council appointed Cheuk as the Deputy Chief Secretary for Administration of the Hong Kong Government.

Deputy Chief Secretary for Administration 
In December 2022, Cheuk said that Hong Kong will stop buying advertising space from Google if Glory to Hong Kong remained as one of the top search results for the national anthem of Hong Kong.

Personal life 
In August 2022, Cheuk tested positive for COVID-19. In September 2022, he tested positive again.

References

1959 births
Living people
Recipients of the Gold Bauhinia Star
Justices of the peace
Government officials of Hong Kong
Alumni of the University of Hong Kong